The 2004 House elections in Georgia occurred on November 2, 2004, to elect the members of the State of Georgia's delegation to the United States House of Representatives. Georgia has thirteen seats in the House, apportioned according to the 2000 United States Census.

These elections were held concurrently with the United States presidential election of 2004, United States Senate elections of 2004 (including one in Georgia), the United States House elections in other states, and various state and local elections.

This would be the last time Democrats would gain a U.S. house seat in Georgia until the 2018 House elections.

Overview

District 1

In this conservative, coastal Georgia-based district, incumbent Republican Congressman Jack Kingston ran for re-election to a seventh term in Congress. Kingston was re-elected in the general election without any opposition whatsoever.

District 2

Incumbent Democratic Congressman Sanford Bishop did not face a credible threat to his re-election in this liberal-leaning, southwest Georgia district. Opposed by Republican Dave Eversman, a businessman and local chamber of commerce official, Bishop was overwhelmingly re-elected.

District 3

In 2002, Jim Marshall was narrowly elected to Congress in this conservative, central Georgia-based district. This year, Congressman Marshall faced a rematch against businessman Calder Clay, who was the Republican nominee for Congress. In a significant improvement over his previous performance, Marshall crushed Clay with over sixty percent of the vote, surprising given the fact that President George W. Bush carried the district comfortably.

District 4

One-term incumbent Democratic Congresswoman Denise Majette opted to run for Senate, creating an open seat in the House. Cynthia McKinney, the previous representative of this district, ran for her sixth nonconsecutive term in Congress. McKinney faced Republican Party official Catherine Davis in the general election, whom she defeated, but by a smaller margin than expected in this solidly liberal district.

District 5

John Lewis, the dean of the Georgia congressional delegation, ran for his tenth term in this solidly liberal, Atlanta-based district. Just as with the previous election, Congressman Lewis was unopposed in the general election and coasted to re-election.

District 6

When three-term incumbent Republican Congressman Johnny Isakson sought election to the Senate, an open seat emerged. Physician Tom Price became the Republican nominee after surviving a contentious primary that featured many candidates and a run-off election. Seeing as no Democratic candidate filed to run in this district, Price was sent to his first term in Congress without opposition. However, in this conservative district based in the northern suburbs of Atlanta, the Republican primary is tantamount to election, so Price would not have faced a serious challenge in either case.

District 7

In Republican Congressman John Linder’s bid for a seventh term, he faced no opposition in any form and was successful in his re-election in this staunchly conservative district rooted in the northern suburbs of Atlanta.

District 8

Though Republican Congressman Mac Collins could have easily won a seventh term in this solidly conservative, gerrymandered district based in the southern suburbs of Atlanta and rural north-central Georgia, he instead opted to run for Senate. Lynn Westmoreland, the Republican leader in the Georgia House of Representatives, became the Republican nominee and faced off against Democratic candidate Silvia Delamar. Delamar did not face a fighting chance in this district that has a proclivity for electing Republicans, and on election day, she was crushed by Westmoreland.

District 9

Though popular Republican Congressman Charlie Norwood faced a challenge from Democrat Bob Ellis, he might as well have been unopposed in this solidly conservative district based in north Georgia and some of the suburbs of Atlanta and Augusta. Come election day, Congressman Norwood was overwhelmingly re-elected to his sixth term in Congress.

District 10

Though he was originally elected as a Democrat, incumbent Congressman Nathan Deal has built a solid profile as a conservative Republican. In this north Georgia district, Deal did not face a Democratic opponent, which meant that he was easily elected to his seventh term.

District 11

Republican Congressman Phil Gingrey has represented this conservative-leaning district since 2002 and ran for his second term this year. The 11th district, which is somewhat moderate only because it is heavily gerrymandered, has a shape that has been described as similar to that of Indonesia. Congressman Gingrey faced a challenge from Rick Crawford, the chairman of the Polk County Democratic Party and a special Assistant Attorney General of Georgia. Gingrey ultimately beat Crawford by a somewhat comfortable margin, undoubtedly helped by the strong performance of President Bush in Georgia that year.

District 12

Though one-term Republican Congressman Max Burns has managed to win election in 2002 in this Democratic-leaning district, his stroke of luck vanished by 2004. Burns faced a scandal- and controversy-free Democratic opponent in Athens-Clarke County Commissioner John Barrow. In a bitterly fought election, Barrow ousted Burns and won his first term in Congress.

District 13

Originally elected in 2002 in a gerrymandered district drawn to elect a Democrat, incumbent Congressman David Scott sought election to a second term in Congress. Congressman Scott did not face any sort of challenge in his re-election bid, so he was sent back to Washington unopposed.

References

2004 Georgia (U.S. state) elections
Georgia
2004